Apoorva Sangamam is a 1990 Indian Malayalam film, directed by Sasi Mohan and produced by Chaithanya Arts.  The film has musical score by Jerry Amaldev.

Cast
 Hareesh
 Karan
 Kuthiravattam Pappu
 Mala Aravindan
 Krishnankutty Nair
 Kollam Thulasi
 Sivaji
 Jagannathan
 Kaladi Jayan

Soundtrack
The music was composed by Jerry Amaldev and the lyrics were written by Puthiyankam Murali.

References

External links
 

1990 films
1990s Malayalam-language films